Carl-Georg Andersson (19 May 1885 – 21 March 1961) was a Swedish wrestler. He competed in the featherweight event at the 1912 Summer Olympics.

References

External links

1885 births
1961 deaths
Olympic wrestlers of Sweden
Wrestlers at the 1912 Summer Olympics
Swedish male sport wrestlers
Sportspeople from Halmstad
Sportspeople from Halland County
20th-century Swedish people